Hametown is an unincorporated community in York County, Pennsylvania, United States. Hametown is located 2 miles north of Shrewsbury on North Main Street.

Notable people
Guy Leader, poultry farm owner and Pennsylvania State Senator, was born in Hametown.

References

Unincorporated communities in York County, Pennsylvania
Unincorporated communities in Pennsylvania